Carlos Zárate Fernández (born 19 July 1980 in Puertollano, Castile-La Mancha) is a Spanish professional road bicycle racer. He turned professional with Kelme in 2004 before moving to Saunier Duval–Prodir in 2006, where he stayed until the end of 2007.

Palmarès 

 Tour of the Basque Country – 1 stage (2004)
 Cinturón a Mallorca – 2 stages (2003)

External links 
 

1980 births
Living people
People from Puertollano
Sportspeople from the Province of Ciudad Real
Spanish male cyclists
Cyclists from Castilla-La Mancha